Nizka is a settlement on the left bank of the Savinja River in the Municipality of Rečica ob Savinji in Slovenia. The area belongs to the traditional Styria region and is now included in the Savinja Statistical Region.

Name
The name of the settlement was changed from Nizka vas to Nizka in 1953.

References

External links
Nizka on Geopedia

Populated places in the Municipality of Rečica ob Savinji